Clostridium fallax is an anaerobic, motile, gram-positive bacterium

References

External links
 Type strain of Clostridium fallax at BacDive -  the Bacterial Diversity Metadatabase

Gram-positive bacteria
Bacteria described in 1923
fallax